Grävenwiesbach is a municipality in the Hochtaunuskreis in Hesse, Germany.

Geography

Location 
Grävenwiesbach lies between 300 and 600 m above sea level north of the Taunus Ridge. The nearest big towns are Wetzlar (20 km) to the north, Limburg (32 km) to the west and Frankfurt am Main (40 km) to the south.

Neighbouring communities 
Grävenwiesbach borders in the north on the communities of Weilmünster (Limburg-Weilburg) and Waldsolms (Lahn-Dill-Kreis), in the east on the towns of Butzbach (Wetteraukreis) and Usingen, and in the south and west on the community of Weilrod (both in the Hochtaunuskreis).

Constituent communities 
The community consists of the centres of Grävenwiesbach, Heinzenberg, Hundstadt, Laubach, Mönstadt and Naunstadt.

History 
Grävenwiesbach had its first documentary mention in 1280. As of 1326, the village belonged to the County – later Principality – of Nassau-Weilburg, with which it passed in 1806 to the newly created Duchy of Nassau. In 1866, Grävenwiesbach became Prussian.

Politics

Municipal council 

The municipal elections on 26 March 2006 yielded the following results:

Note: FWG is a citizens' coalition.

Partnerships 
 Grävenwiesbach has maintained a partnership with Wuenheim in Alsace, France since 6 September 1980.

Coat of arms 
Grävenwiesbach's civic coat of arms might heraldically be described thus: Or a spreadeagle sable armed and langued gules, above each wing a mullet of six azure.

The earliest town seals show this same composition, including one example known from 1534 but dating from the previous century. The arms have remained virtually unchanged since then, but were only officially granted in 1952, at which time the tincture azure (blue) was chosen for the mullets (stars), as that was Nassau's colour, under which Grävenwiesbach had lived for centuries. The reason for the mullets being in the arms, however, is not known. The eagle is, of course, the old Imperial eagle.

Economy and infrastructure

Transport 
On 1 June 1909, the Frankfurt - Bad Homburg - Usingen - Weilburg railway line also reached Grävenwiesbach. After a spur line to Wetzlar was opened on 1 November 1912, Grävenwiesbach station became a small railway hub. This was the beginning of moderate industrialization as well as the first step towards reorienting Grävenwiesbach towards the Rhine-Main economic area.

Nowadays, Grävenwiesbach is an operations centre for the Taunusbahn railway, run by the Hessische Landesbahn GmbH, and running from Bad Homburg to Usingen and on to Brandoberndorf.

Education 
In Grävenwiesbach there is only a primary school. A Hauptschule, a Realschule and a Gymnasium are available in Usingen.

Literature 
 So war es einst. Grävenwiesbach im Wandel der Zeiten. Publisher: Heimatverein Grävenwiesbach e.V., 
 Unsere Bahn. Publisher: Heimatverein Grävenwiesbach e.V.

References

External links 
 Website der Gemeinde Grävenwiesbach
 

Hochtaunuskreis